Marubini Lourane Lubengo is a South African politician for the African National Congress. She has been a member of the National Assembly of South Africa since 2019. Lubengo had previously served in the Limpopo Provincial Legislature.

Lubengo serves on the National Assembly's Portfolio Committee on Small Business Development and the Standing Committee on Public Accounts.

References

Living people
Year of birth missing (living people)
Place of birth missing (living people)
People from Limpopo
Members of the Limpopo Provincial Legislature
Women members of provincial legislatures of South Africa
Members of the National Assembly of South Africa
Women members of the National Assembly of South Africa